In mathematics, in the field of group theory, a subgroup of a group is said to be fully normalized if every automorphism of the subgroup lifts to an inner automorphism of the whole group. Another way of putting this is that the natural embedding from the Weyl group of the subgroup to its automorphism group is surjective.

Some facts:
 Every group can be embedded as a normal and fully normalized subgroup of a bigger group. A natural construction for this is the holomorph, which is its semidirect product with its automorphism group.
 A complete group is fully normalized in any bigger group in which it is embedded because every automorphism of it is inner.
 Every fully normalized subgroup has the automorphism extension property.

Subgroup properties